Klaus-Dieter Seehaus (6 October 1942, in Hagen – 10 February 1996, in Rostock) was a German footballer who played as a midfielder and competed in the 1964 Summer Olympics.

References

External links
 

1942 births
1996 deaths
German footballers
Olympic footballers of the United Team of Germany
Olympic bronze medalists for the United Team of Germany
Olympic medalists in football
Footballers at the 1964 Summer Olympics
Medalists at the 1964 Summer Olympics
German footballers needing infoboxes
Association football midfielders
Sportspeople from Hagen
East Germany international footballers
Footballers from North Rhine-Westphalia